Sunday Arts is a weekly program on the Australian Broadcasting Corporation (ABC) in Australia every Sunday. It gives a broad view of the various artists working in Australia today ranging from theatre, music, visual art, film, literature, to indigenous, cultural, and street art. It was hosted by Michael Veitch from 2006 until its cancellation in November 2009.

See also 
 Simon Schama's Power of Art

External links 
 Website 

Australian Broadcasting Corporation original programming